The Nizhny Novgorod Constituency (No. 129) is a Russian legislative constituency in Nizhny Novgorod Oblast.

The constituency covers the Nizhny Novgorod city districts of Nizhegorodsky, and Sovetsky, and the districts of Bolsheboldinsky, Bolshemurashkinsky, Buturlinsky, Vorotynsky, Gaginsky, Knyagininsky, Krasnooktyabrsky, Kstovsky, Lyskovsky, Pilninsky, Sergachsky, Sechenovsky and Spassky. It is also the constituency for all Russian expatriates living in countries which are not already assigned to other constituencies, 98 foreign countries in total.

Members elected
By-election are shown in italics.

Election Results

1993

|-
! colspan=2 style="background-color:#E9E9E9;text-align:left;vertical-align:top;" |Candidate
! style="background-color:#E9E9E9;text-align:left;vertical-align:top;" |Party
! style="background-color:#E9E9E9;text-align:right;" |Votes
! style="background-color:#E9E9E9;text-align:right;" |%
|-
|style="background-color:"|
|align=left|Yevgeny Bushmin
|align=left|Independent
|
|30.35%
|-
|style="background-color:"|
|align=left|Aleksandr Maltsev
|align=left|Independent
|
|22.76%
|-
|style="background-color:"|
|align=left|Aleksey Skotnikov
|align=left|Independent
|
|14.65%
|-
|style="background-color:#EA3C38"|
|align=left|Boris Sevryugin
|align=left|Civic Union
|
|4.59%
|-
|style="background-color:#DBB726"|
|align=left|Vladimir Fomin
|align=left|Democratic Party
|
|3.85%
|-
|style="background-color:#000000"|
|colspan=2 |against all
|
|14.79%
|-
| colspan="5" style="background-color:#E9E9E9;"|
|- style="font-weight:bold"
| colspan="3" style="text-align:left;" | Total
| 
| 100%
|-
| colspan="5" style="background-color:#E9E9E9;"|
|- style="font-weight:bold"
| colspan="4" |Source:
|
|}

1995

|-
! colspan=2 style="background-color:#E9E9E9;text-align:left;vertical-align:top;" |Candidate
! style="background-color:#E9E9E9;text-align:left;vertical-align:top;" |Party
! style="background-color:#E9E9E9;text-align:right;" |Votes
! style="background-color:#E9E9E9;text-align:right;" |%
|-
|style="background-color:"|
|align=left|Aleksandr Maltsev
|align=left|Independent
|
|27.78%
|-
|style="background-color:"|
|align=left|Nadir Khafizov
|align=left|Independent
|
|21.86%
|-
|style="background-color:"|
|align=left|Yevgeny Bushmin (incumbent)
|align=left|Independent
|
|16.70%
|-
|style="background-color:"|
|align=left|Valery Yeliseev
|align=left|Political Movement of Transport Workers
|
|4.32%
|-
|style="background-color:"|
|align=left|Andrey Morev
|align=left|Liberal Democratic Party
|
|3.68%
|-
|style="background-color:#1A1A1A"|
|align=left|Vasily Anoshchenkov
|align=left|Stanislav Govorukhin Bloc
|
|3.54%
|-
|style="background-color:#0D0900"|
|align=left|Anatoly Moiseev
|align=left|People's Union
|
|2.92%
|-
|style="background-color:"|
|align=left|Aleksandr Sysoev
|align=left|Independent
|
|2.69%
|-
|style="background-color:"|
|align=left|Gennady Tuzin
|align=left|Independent
|
|2.22%
|-
|style="background-color:"|
|align=left|Gennady Shurygin
|align=left|Independent
|
|2.02%
|-
|style="background-color:#959698"|
|align=left|Vladimir Maystrenko
|align=left|Derzhava
|
|1.43%
|-
|style="background-color:#000000"|
|colspan=2 |against all
|
|8.07%
|-
| colspan="5" style="background-color:#E9E9E9;"|
|- style="font-weight:bold"
| colspan="3" style="text-align:left;" | Total
| 
| 100%
|-
| colspan="5" style="background-color:#E9E9E9;"|
|- style="font-weight:bold"
| colspan="4" |Source:
|
|}

1999

|-
! colspan=2 style="background-color:#E9E9E9;text-align:left;vertical-align:top;" |Candidate
! style="background-color:#E9E9E9;text-align:left;vertical-align:top;" |Party
! style="background-color:#E9E9E9;text-align:right;" |Votes
! style="background-color:#E9E9E9;text-align:right;" |%
|-
|style="background-color:"|
|align=left|Dmitry Savelyev
|align=left|Independent
|
|29.36%
|-
|style="background-color:"|
|align=left|Nikolay Ryabov
|align=left|Independent
|
|11.71%
|-
|style="background-color:"|
|align=left|Ryashit Bayazitov
|align=left|Independent
|
|10.07%
|-
|style="background-color:"|
|align=left|Aleksandr Maltsev (incumbent)
|align=left|Independent
|
|9.07%
|-
|style="background-color:"|
|align=left|Nikolay Khvatkov
|align=left|Independent
|
|7.81%
|-
|style="background-color:#23238E"|
|align=left|Vyacheslav Bolyak
|align=left|Our Home – Russia
|
|6.23%
|-
|style="background-color:"|
|align=left|Aleksandr Listkov
|align=left|Independent
|
|5.26%
|-
|style="background-color:"|
|align=left|Yevgeny Belyakov
|align=left|Independent
|
|1.20%
|-
|style="background-color:"|
|align=left|Nikolay Leshkov
|align=left|Independent
|
|1.16%
|-
|style="background-color:#084284"|
|align=left|Yevgeny Alekseev
|align=left|Spiritual Heritage
|
|1.07%
|-
|style="background-color:"|
|align=left|Anatoly Nekrasov
|align=left|Liberal Democratic Party
|
|0.79%
|-
|style="background-color:"|
|align=left|Ravil Aksenov
|align=left|Independent
|
|0.78%
|-
|style="background-color:#C62B55"|
|align=left|Dmitry Popkov
|align=left|Peace, Labour, May
|
|0.47%
|-
|style="background-color:"|
|align=left|Aleksandr Khrushchev
|align=left|Independent
|
|0.34%
|-
|style="background-color:#000000"|
|colspan=2 |against all
|
|12.61%
|-
| colspan="5" style="background-color:#E9E9E9;"|
|- style="font-weight:bold"
| colspan="3" style="text-align:left;" | Total
| 
| 100%
|-
| colspan="5" style="background-color:#E9E9E9;"|
|- style="font-weight:bold"
| colspan="4" |Source:
|
|}

2003

|-
! colspan=2 style="background-color:#E9E9E9;text-align:left;vertical-align:top;" |Candidate
! style="background-color:#E9E9E9;text-align:left;vertical-align:top;" |Party
! style="background-color:#E9E9E9;text-align:right;" |Votes
! style="background-color:#E9E9E9;text-align:right;" |%
|-
|style="background-color:#1042A5"|
|align=left|Aleksey Likhachev
|align=left|Union of Right Forces
|
|34.94%
|-
|style="background-color:"|
|align=left|Nikolay Ryabov
|align=left|Communist Party
|
|14.82%
|-
|style="background-color:"|
|align=left|Nikolay Khvatkov
|align=left|Independent
|
|7.21%
|-
|style="background-color:"|
|align=left|Yury Shcherbakov
|align=left|Independent
|
|7.20%
|-
|style="background-color:#00A1FF"|
|align=left|Vladimir Tabunkin
|align=left|Party of Russia's Rebirth-Russian Party of Life
|
|5.12%
|-
|style="background-color:"|
|align=left|Vladimir Gryadasov
|align=left|Independent
|
|3.41%
|-
|style="background-color:"|
|align=left|Nikolay Gerasimov
|align=left|Independent
|
|2.96%
|-
|style="background-color:"|
|align=left|Valery Biryukov
|align=left|Independent
|
|2.94%
|-
|style="background-color:"|
|align=left|Aleksandr Rebyatkin
|align=left|Liberal Democratic Party
|
|2.71%
|-
|style="background-color:"|
|align=left|Vyacheslav Aksinyin
|align=left|Independent
|
|1.58%
|-
|style="background-color:"|
|align=left|Shamil Sudiyarov
|align=left|Independent
|
|1.15%
|-
|style="background-color:#000000"|
|colspan=2 |against all
|
|13.44%
|-
| colspan="5" style="background-color:#E9E9E9;"|
|- style="font-weight:bold"
| colspan="3" style="text-align:left;" | Total
| 
| 100%
|-
| colspan="5" style="background-color:#E9E9E9;"|
|- style="font-weight:bold"
| colspan="4" |Source:
|
|}

2016

|-
! colspan=2 style="background-color:#E9E9E9;text-align:left;vertical-align:top;" |Candidate
! style="background-color:#E9E9E9;text-align:left;vertical-align:top;" |Party
! style="background-color:#E9E9E9;text-align:right;" |Votes
! style="background-color:#E9E9E9;text-align:right;" |%
|-
|style="background-color:"|
|align=left|Vladimir Panov
|align=left|United Russia
|
|42.39%
|-
|style="background:"| 
|align=left|Aleksandr Bochkarev
|align=left|A Just Russia
|
|20.06%
|-
|style="background-color:"|
|align=left|Denis Voronenkov
|align=left|Communist Party
|
|13.99%
|-
|style="background-color:"|
|align=left|Dmitry Nikolaev
|align=left|Liberal Democratic Party
|
|7.33%
|-
|style="background:"| 
|align=left|Anna Stepanova
|align=left|People's Freedom Party
|
|3.42%
|-
|style="background:"| 
|align=left|Ilya Ulyanov
|align=left|Communists of Russia
|
|3.37%
|-
|style="background:"| 
|align=left|Valery Kuznetsov
|align=left|Party of Growth
|
|3.31%
|-
|style="background-color:"|
|align=left|Aleksey Molev
|align=left|Rodina
|
|1.97%
|-
| colspan="5" style="background-color:#E9E9E9;"|
|- style="font-weight:bold"
| colspan="3" style="text-align:left;" | Total
| 
| 100%
|-
| colspan="5" style="background-color:#E9E9E9;"|
|- style="font-weight:bold"
| colspan="4" |Source:
|
|}

2018

|-
! colspan=2 style="background-color:#E9E9E9;text-align:left;vertical-align:top;" |Candidate
! style="background-color:#E9E9E9;text-align:left;vertical-align:top;" |Party
! style="background-color:#E9E9E9;text-align:right;" |Votes
! style="background-color:#E9E9E9;text-align:right;" |%
|-
|style="background-color:"|
|align=left|Dmitry Svatkovsky
|align=left|United Russia
|
|47.34%
|-
|style="background-color:"|
|align=left|Nikolay Ryabov
|align=left|Communist Party
|
|22.32%
|-
|style="background:"| 
|align=left|Tatyana Grinevich
|align=left|A Just Russia
|
|10.78%
|-
|style="background-color:"|
|align=left|Aleksey Kruglov
|align=left|Liberal Democratic Party
|
|9.33%
|-
|style="background-color:"|
|align=left|Oleg Rodin
|align=left|Yabloko
|
|4.48%
|-
| colspan="5" style="background-color:#E9E9E9;"|
|- style="font-weight:bold"
| colspan="3" style="text-align:left;" | Total
| 
| 100%
|-
| colspan="5" style="background-color:#E9E9E9;"|
|- style="font-weight:bold"
| colspan="4" |Source:
|
|}

2021

|-
! colspan=2 style="background-color:#E9E9E9;text-align:left;vertical-align:top;" |Candidate
! style="background-color:#E9E9E9;text-align:left;vertical-align:top;" |Party
! style="background-color:#E9E9E9;text-align:right;" |Votes
! style="background-color:#E9E9E9;text-align:right;" |%
|-
|style="background-color: " |
|align=left|Anatoly Lesun
|align=left|United Russia
|107,625
|43.61%
|-
|style="background-color: " |
|align=left|Tatyana Grinevich
|align=left|A Just Russia — For Truth
|36,495
|14.79%
|-
|style="background-color: " |
|align=left|
|align=left|Communist Party
|31,209
|12.65%
|-
|style="background-color: " |
|align=left|Aleksey Kruglov
|align=left|Liberal Democratic Party
|14,010
|5.68%
|-
|style="background-color: " |
|align=left|Anna Cherednichenko
|align=left|New People
|13,274
|5.38%
|-
| style="background-color: " |
|align=left|Dmitry Dobrovolsky
|align=left|Communists of Russia
|13,211
|5.35%
|-
|style="background-color: " |
|align=left|Sergey Rybakov
|align=left|Party of Pensioners
|11,004
|4.46%
|-
|style="background-color: " |
|align=left|Mikhail Garanin
|align=left|Party of Growth
|8,354
|3.39%
|-
|style="background-color: " |
|align=left|Vladimir Ponomaryov
|align=left|Rodina
|3,741
|1.52%
|-
| colspan="5" style="background-color:#E9E9E9;"|
|- style="font-weight:bold"
| colspan="3" style="text-align:left;" | Total
| 246,789
| 100%
|-
| colspan="5" style="background-color:#E9E9E9;"|
|- style="font-weight:bold"
| colspan="4" |Source:
|
|}

Notes

References 

Russian legislative constituencies
Politics of Nizhny Novgorod Oblast